Bernard Amé Léonard du Bus de Gisignies (21 June 1808 in Saint-Josse-ten-Noode – 6 July 1874 in Bad Ems) was a Dutch nobleman and later on a Belgian politician, ornithologist and paleontologist. He was the second son of Leonard Pierre Joseph du Bus de Gisignies. He married Petronilla Truyts on 19 May 1845, together they had two children; Viscount Bernard Daniel (Saint-Josse-ten-Noode, 7 October 1832 - Brussels, 17 February 1917) and Viscount Chretien (Saint-Josse-ten-Noode, 4 November 1845 - Jabbeke, 3 July 1883).

He studied law at the State University of Louvain, but soon became more interested in ornithology. In 1835 he presented a manuscript to the Royal Academy of Belgium in which described the bird Leptorhynchus pectoralis (the banded stilt). He was a member of parliament for Soignies.

He became the first director of the Royal Belgian Institute of Natural Sciences in 1846. On this occasion he donated 2474 birds from his own collection to the museum. In 1860, during the construction of new fortifications around Antwerp he became involved in paleontology. The fossils found were mainly from whales. He also obtained the skeletons from a bowhead whale (Balaena mysticetus) and a young blue whale (Balaenoptera musculus), which are still on display in the museum. In 1860 the skeleton of a mammoth was found near Lier and was brought to the museum (on display since 1869). At that time the only other skeleton of a mammoth was on display in the museum of Saint Petersburg (Russia).

In 1867 he became the director of the science section of the Royal Academy of Belgium.

Sources
 Bernard du Bus de Gisignies (Dutch)
 Heemkundige Kring van Malle (Ed.), Camera Obscura op Oost- en Westmalle, 1980
 Bart De Prins (Ed.), Leonard du Bus de Gisignies, Heemkundige Kring van Malle, 1999

Belgian ornithologists
Belgian zoologists
Belgian paleontologists
State University of Leuven alumni
1808 births
1874 deaths
Belgian nobility
Jonkheers of the Netherlands
People from Saint-Josse-ten-Noode